Still Waters is a 1949 detective novel by E.C.R. Lorac, the pen name of the British writer Edith Caroline Rivett. It is the thirty second in her long-running series featuring Chief Inspector MacDonald of Scotland Yard, one of the more orthodox detectives of the Golden Age of Detective Fiction.

Synopsis
It was one of several novels Lorac set in the Lancashire fell country around Lunesdale where she spent much of her time. It follows a woman who buys a farm near a former quarry and begins experiencing a series of strange events, and it seems she may be the victim of other potential owners of the farm who linger in the area.

References

Bibliography
 Cooper, John & Pike, B.A. Artists in Crime: An Illustrated Survey of Crime Fiction First Edition Dustwrappers, 1920-1970. Scolar Press, 1995.
 Hubin, Allen J. Crime Fiction, 1749-1980: A Comprehensive Bibliography. Garland Publishing, 1984.
 Nichols, Victoria & Thompson, Susan. Silk Stalkings: More Women Write of Murder. Scarecrow Press, 1998.
 Reilly, John M. Twentieth Century Crime & Mystery Writers. Springer, 2015.

1949 British novels
British mystery novels
Novels by E.C.R. Lorac
Novels set in Lancashire
British detective novels
Collins Crime Club books